Zalu Ab Rural District is a rural district (dehestan) in the Central District of Ravansar County, Kermanshah Province, Iran. At the 2006 census, its population was 4,162, in 881 families. The rural district has 29 villages.

References 

Rural Districts of Kermanshah Province
Ravansar County